Sarawut Konglarp (born October 30, 1987), simply known as Arm, is a Thai professional footballer who plays as a goalkeeper.

Club career

References

External links
 Profile at Goal

1987 births
Living people
Sarawut Konglarp
Sarawut Konglarp
Association football goalkeepers
Sarawut Konglarp
Sarawut Konglarp
Sarawut Konglarp
Sarawut Konglarp
Sarawut Konglarp
Sarawut Konglarp
Sarawut Konglarp
Sarawut Konglarp